Stephen Philip Cohen (May 28, 1945 – January 25, 2017) was a scholar on Middle Eastern affairs.  In 1979 he founded the Institute for Middle East Peace and Development and served as president of that institute.  The Institute is based at the Graduate Center of the City University of New York.

Life and career
Cohen was born in Quebec on May 28, 1945 to parents of Lithuanian and Romanian-Jewish descent. He obtained a bachelor's degree from McGill University and later earned his Ph.D. at Harvard University in social psychology. Early on he concerned himself with problem-solving workshops between Israelis and Palestinians.  He published a book on small group interaction between the two groups.

He has taught at Harvard University, Hebrew University, Princeton University and Lehigh University.  In the 1970s he was an intermediary between Egypt's Anwar Sadat and Israel's Moshe Dayan. In this time he also organized the first meetings between Shimon Peres and Anwar Sadat and between Yitzhak Rabin, Shimon Peres and Abba Eban with the leaders of the National Democratic Party (Egypt). Dayan and the future United Nations Secretary-General Boutros Boutros Ghali encouraged him to establish the institute that would become the Institute for Middle East Peace and Development.

He has developed and maintained relationships with Arab heads of states and Israeli office-holders from the Labor Party and the Likud Party.

From 1990 to 2000 Cohen served on the staff of the Center for Middle East Peace and Economic Cooperation, not to be confused with the above cited organization on Middle Eastern affairs.

Cohen was a longtime resident of Teaneck, New Jersey, where he died at the age of 71 on January 25, 2017 from male breast cancer.

References

1945 births
2017 deaths
Deaths from cancer in New Jersey
Deaths from male breast cancer
Harvard Graduate School of Arts and Sciences alumni
People from Teaneck, New Jersey
Academics from Quebec
McGill University alumni
Canadian people of Romanian-Jewish descent
Canadian people of Lithuanian-Jewish descent
Canadian political scientists
Canadian expatriate academics in the United States